Yaoi-Con (sometimes YaoiCon) was an annual three-day anime convention, founded in 2001, aimed at fans of yaoi-related anime, manga, and other aspects of Asian culture. It typically took place during the Fall in California.

Since the 2012 edition, its organizer and main sponsor was Digital Manga Publishing. It was known mostly for its unique events that use volunteers known as "bishounen". The bishounen were male volunteers who represented the attractive characters shown in Yaoi manga, and ran many of the events.

Programming

As with other anime conventions, Yaoi-Con had panels and workshops (with a yaoi twist), a 24-hour video room, a manga library, swap meet, a Dealers' Room filled with merchandise, a cosplay Masquerade and an anime music video contest. In addition, Yaoi-Con held a fan fiction contest, Bishounen Bingo, and its extraordinarily popular Saturday night fundraising Bishounen Auction. At bingo, and the auction, the bishounen volunteers put on shows and stripped to entertain the convention goers.

Each year Yaoi-Con sponsored at least one Japanese yaoi manga artist as guest of honor. And, as yaoi publishing expanded in the U.S., the companies who attended Yaoi-Con became interested in bringing guests with them. Guests of honor usually participated in question and answer/autograph sessions as well as sketch sessions where they demonstrated to attendees how they produced their work.

Because of the adult nature of its theme, Yaoi-Con required all attendees to be at least 18 and checked the legal ID of all attendees upon registration.  As of 2003, 85% of Yaoi-Con membership were female, and mostly heterosexual.

Inactivity 
In December 2017, DMP announced that Yaoi-Con was taking "a one-year break", expecting to return "stronger than ever in Fall 2019." A tweet in January 2019 indicated that a new, non-profit organization might take over the event, but this never materialized. While the Yaoi-Con website went offline at the beginning of 2020, a public facebook group page is still semi-active.

History

Event history

References

External links
 (defunct, link via Internet Archive)

Convention reports
"Yaoi-Con 2005: A Celebration of Female Fantasies," by K. Avila, Sequential Tart, Dec. 2005
"Yaoi Con No. 5," by C.N. Scott, Sequential Tart, Dec. 2005

Defunct anime conventions
Erotic events
San Francisco Bay Area conventions
Yaoi
Recurring events established in 2001
Recurring events disestablished in 2017
2001 establishments in California
Conventions in California